Deep Space Communications Complex can refer to:

 The Canberra Deep Space Communications Complex located at Tidbinbilla, Australian Capital Territory near Canberra, Australia
 The Goldstone Deep Space Communications Complex located about 35 miles north of Barstow, California on the Fort Irwin Military Reservation
 The Madrid Deep Space Communication Complex located in Madrid, Spain
 The Indian Deep Space Network located in Byalalu, India